Apsines of Gadara (fl. 3rd century AD) was a Greek rhetorician. He was a native of the Hellenised city of Gadara, whose ruins stand today at the border of Jordan with Syria and Israel. Apsines went on to study at Smyrna and taught at Athens, gaining such a reputation that he was raised to the consulship by the emperor Maximinus. He was a rival of Fronto of Emesa, and a friend of Philostratus, the author of the Lives of the Sophists, who praises his wonderful memory and accuracy.

Two rhetorical treatises by him are extant:
 His Τέχνη ῥητορική ("Art of Rhetoric") is a greatly interpolated handbook of rhetoric, a considerable portion being taken from the Rhetoric of Longinus and other material from Hermogenes;
an English translation was first published in 1997. Malcolm Heath has argued (APJ 1998) that the work's attribution to Apsines is incorrect.
 A smaller work, Περὶ ἐσχηματισμένων προβλημάτων ("on Propositions maintained figuratively").

Editions
 Jan Bake (1849)
 Spengel-Hammer, Rhetores Graeci (1894)
 Mervin R. Dilts and George A. Kennedy, eds., Two Greek Rhetorical Treatises from the Roman Empire (Brill, 1997)

References

 Hammer, De Apsine Rhetore (1876)
 Volkmann, Letorile der Griechen und Romer (1885)

External links
 Bryn Mawr Classical Review page on Dilts/Kennedy

3rd-century Greek people
3rd-century Romans
Ancient Greek rhetoricians
Ancient Greek educators
3rd-century writers
Roman-era Athenian rhetoricians
Ancient Smyrna
Imperial Roman consuls
Ancient Greeks in Rome
Year of birth unknown
Year of death unknown